The Minister for Financial Markets (Swedish: finansmarknadsminister) is a cabinet minister within the Swedish Government and appointed by the Prime Minister of Sweden.

The minister is responsible for issues regarding financial markets, municipalities and counties, gambling and state-owned companies. The Minister for Financial Markets is also deputy Minister for Finance. The current Minister for Financial Markets is Niklas Wykman, appointed on 18 October 2022.

List of Ministers for Financial Markets 

Government ministers of Sweden